The British School of Brasilia (abbreviated BSB) is an international school serving the local and international community in Brasilia. Opening in August 2016 it caters for Early Years, Primary and Secondary aged children. The school follows the English National Curriculum and it will expand up to Year 13.

Curriculum 

The curriculum is unique in design and has been developed and refined for almost two decades, drawing on the experience and expertise of the British School Foundation in establishing successful schools all over the world.

It is aspirational, inspiring pupils to flourish both personally and academically and designed with three key outcomes in mind: 

Strong Academic Foundations
To provide pupils with the strong academic foundations on which educational and professional success are built.

Decision Making
To equip pupils with the experience and confidence to make effective decisions that shape their environment.

Character 
To guide pupils towards personal character traits that will serve them well and enable them to contribute positively to their community. 

The English National Curriculum is a starting point for our curriculum but we go well beyond its limitations.
The Integrated Curriculum places additional focus on developing the personal attributes of our pupils,
fully preparing them for the rigours of the formal examinations that they will take from Year 10 upwards.  

Success in these essential formal qualifications will provide a clear pathway to the best universities in the world. 

The school curriculum stands out for several reasons. 

It is unique

In Primary and Secondary School, our mentoring programme supports both the personal and academic development of every individual. 

Mentors know their pupils exceptionally well and are able to form strong, positive relationships with parents, ensuring that pupil wellbeing is always a priority. 

As pupils move through the school they experience significant choice in some elements of their curriculum under the guidance of their mentor. This enables them to pursue their passions and areas of interest. 

This results in a unique experience for each pupil. 

It is uncompromising 

One of our core beliefs is that every individual can and will succeed at our school.  The school adopts an uncompromising approach for all pupils to achieve the highest standards of attainment in the core curriculum subjects of English, Maths, Portuguese and Science.  Its programme is designed to support proficiency in both English and Portuguese, ensuring a high level of competency and confidence in both languages.  

While the development of knowledge and skills is crucial, they place an emphasis on problem solving and critical thinking, consolidating the ability of pupils to work independently and collaboratively. 

Pupils who complete their education at BSB will achieve qualifications and qualities that enable them to compete for places at the best universities worldwide and fulfill their personal and professional aspirations. 

It is holistic 

The personal development of pupils is our number one priority and we place great emphasis on developing the key qualities that we believe underpin success.

A vibrant house system, challenging outward bounds programme, pupil voice and school service initiatives provide ample opportunities for pupils to demonstrate these character traits while taking greater responsibility in shaping their school experience.  

In addition to a rigorous and challenging academic programme, BSB offers vibrant Sports, Music and Arts programmes in which pupils are presented with many opportunities to participate, collaborate, perform and excel. 

It is global

The curriculum is global in outlook and reflects the international nature of the school community.

It incorporates the core values associated with British education and applies them to a diverse range of experiences and curriculum content.  

Pupils are encouraged to develop an awareness of the world beyond their immediate context and engage in important global themes through the wide range of educational opportunities that they experience at BSB.

Location and Facilities 
The school enjoys a spacious, green, clean-air surrounding located in the Asa Sul area of Brasilia, close to many embassies. Designed by Oscar Niemeyer and featuring murals by Athos Bulcão, BSB has the facilities of any top international school around the world. These include modern classrooms with the latest technology, music rooms, language rooms, a dining hall, well-stocked library and a multi-purpose hall. Sports facilities include a multi-purpose pitch.

Classrooms 
All classrooms are generously resourced and equipped to meet English National Curriculum standards, making use of state-of-the-art technologies, such as Interactive White Boards (standard in all classrooms). Specialist classrooms include: Music room, Language room, Library and a multi-purpose hall.

Recreational Areas 
BSB has exceptionally well equipped playgrounds, combining a selection of climbing frames and multi purpose surfaces. EYFS, Primary and Secondary pupils enjoy separate age appropriate areas in which to relax, play and socialise. The Sports programme is well supported by our facilities that support the wide range of activities that we offer.

Libraries 
BSB has exceptionally well resourced libraries with a wide selection of books and resources imported from the UK. The libraries are complemented with comfortable reading areas to encourage a love of books and reading.

Campus 
The buildings offer generously proportioned learning areas that create a calm and secure environment in which to learn. Outside areas are beautifully maintained and provide an environment in which the pupils can enjoy their daily activities. The canteen provides an opportunity for “al fresco” lunch time meals with a view of the trees that form an important part of the grounds.

Administration 
BSB is governed by the British Schools Foundation, a UK non-profit organisation which aims to promote British-style education worldwide. The day-to-day operation is overseen by the headteacher. Headquartered in London, the British Schools Foundation is a network of British schools around the world with a presence in 11 cities including Brasilia, Kuala Lumpur, Manila, Marbella, Moscow, Nanjing, New York, Pamplona, Sao Paulo, Tashkent and Yangon. More than 4,000 students aged 2–18 attend BSF schools.

References

External links 

 The British School of Brasilia
 The British Schools Foundation
 National Curriculum of England and Wales

Schools in Brasília
International schools in Brazil
British international schools